David Stockton (born June 24, 1991) is an American professional basketball player for the Fort Wayne Mad Ants of the NBA G League. He played college basketball for Gonzaga University and is the son of Hall of Fame point guard John Stockton.

High school career
Stockton attended Gonzaga Preparatory School in Spokane, Washington. As a senior in 2008–09, he averaged 12.4 points in 20 games as he helped lead the Bullpups to a 24-6 record. He led all scorers with 22 points as Gonzaga Prep defeated Inglemoor 72-64 in overtime to claim fourth place in the 2009 Washington State Class 4A Basketball Tournament. He also quarterbacked Prep's football team to an 8-2 record as senior.

College career
After redshirting the 2009–10 season, Stockton joined the Gonzaga Bulldogs for his freshman season in 2010–11. He appeared in 34 of 35 games off the bench as he averaged 4.2 points, 1.3 rebounds and 2.1 assists in 15.6 minutes per game.

In his sophomore season, Stockton started his first career game in the season opener against Eastern Washington, before coming off the bench for the rest of the season. In 33 games, he averaged 3.7 points, 1.0 rebounds and 2.4 assists in 16.8 minutes per game.

In his junior season, Stockton appeared in all 35 games with his lone start coming against Lewis-Clark State College. He scored a season-high 13 points against the Warriors to best his 12-point performance opening-night against Southern Utah. He averaged 3.7 points, 1.7 rebounds, 3.4 assists and 1.5 steals in 18.7 minutes per game.

In his senior season, Stockton was named to the 2014 WCC All-Tournament Team after helping Gonzaga win the tournament. In 36 games (all starts), he averaged 7.4 points, 2.4 rebounds, 4.2 assists and 1.5 steals in 27.8 minutes per game.

Professional career

Reno Bighorns (2014–2015)
After going undrafted in the 2014 NBA draft, Stockton joined the Phoenix Suns for the 2014 NBA Summer League. On September 29, 2014, he signed with the Washington Wizards. However, he was later waived by the Wizards on October 3. On November 1, he was selected by the Maine Red Claws in the third round of the 2014 NBA Development League Draft. He was later traded to the Reno Bighorns on draft night.

Sacramento Kings (2015) 
On February 20, 2015, Stockton signed a 10-day contract with the Sacramento Kings. The next day, he made his NBA debut, recording one point, two rebounds and one assist in the Kings' 126–99 loss to the Los Angeles Clippers. Following the expiry of his contract on March 1, the Kings decided to not re-sign Stockton to a second 10-day contract. On March 2, he was reacquired by Reno, and four days later, he tied the NBA Development League record for most assists in a game with 22 against the Texas Legends. On March 22, Stockton recorded his first career triple-double after recording 36 points, 10 rebounds and 14 assists in a 128-113 win over the Idaho Stampede. On April 12, he returned to the Kings, signing with them through the 2015–16 season.

Return to the Bighorns (2015–2016) 
In July 2015, Stockton joined the Kings for the 2015 NBA Summer League. On October 22, he was waived by the Kings after appearing in three preseason games. On November 27, he was reacquired by the Reno Bighorns.

In July 2016, Stockton re-joined the Kings for the 2016 NBA Summer League.

Cedevita Zagreb (2016)
On July 23, 2016, Stockton signed a three-year deal with Croatian club Cedevita Zagreb. In early November 2016, he left Cedevita in order to sign in New Zealand.

New Zealand Breakers (2016–2017)
On November 10, 2016, Stockton signed with the New Zealand Breakers for the rest of the 2016–17 NBL season, as an injury replacement player for Ben Woodside. He made his debut for the Breakers on November 18, scoring an equal game-high 17 points in 24 minutes off the bench in a 100–85 win over the Illawarra Hawks. On December 2, he recorded a game-high 24 points and 10 assists in a 95–91 loss to Illawarra. He averaged 15 points and 6.5 assists per game over his first four outings with the Breakers, but over his next six games, his numbers dropped considerably, as he failed to record double digits in either points or assists. On January 7, 2017, he was released by the Breakers due to what the club cited as an ongoing back injury. In 10 games, he averaged 8.3 points, 2.7 rebounds and 4.2 assists per game.

Third stint with the Bighorns (2017–2018)
On February 24, 2017, Stockton was reacquired by the Reno Bighorns.

In July 2017, Stockton joined the Phoenix Suns for the 2017 NBA Summer League. He signed with the Sacramento Kings on October 10, 2017, and then waived five days later. On October 22, he was named in the Reno Bighorns 2017–18 training camp roster.

Utah Jazz (2018)
On March 17, 2018, Stockton signed a 10-day contract with the Utah Jazz. With his father John Stockton in attendance, he made his debut for the Jazz on March 25, scoring two points off free throws in a 110–91 win over the Golden State Warriors. He signed a second 10-day contract on March 27, and a rest-of-season contract on April 6.

Medi Bayreuth (2018–2019)
On August 1, 2018, Stockton signed with Medi Bayreuth of the German Basketball Bundesliga.

South Bay Lakers (2019–2020)
On October 4, 2019, Stockton signed with the Los Angeles Lakers. He was waived in training camp but added to the roster of the Lakers' G League affiliate, the South Bay Lakers. On November 30, 2019, Stockton posted 30 points, 10 assists, five rebounds and four steals in a loss to the Rio Grande Valley Vipers. He missed two games in December with a hamstring injury. Stockton averaged 15.3 points, 2.6 rebounds, 6.9 assists and 1.2 steals per game.

Mets de Guaynabo (2020)
On October 26, 2020, Stockton signed with the Mets de Guaynabo of Puerto Rico's Baloncesto Superior Nacional.

Memphis Hustle (2021)
On January 11, 2021, the Memphis Hustle acquired Stockton's returning player rights from the South Bay Lakers in exchange for the returning rights to Dusty Hannahs. On January 26, 2021, Stockton signed with the Hustle.

Return to Mets de Guaynabo (2021)
On June 22, 2021, Stockton re-signed with the Mets de Guaynabo.

Return to the Hustle (2021–2022)
On October 15, 2021, Stockton signed with the Memphis Grizzlies, but was waived the next day. On October 23, he re-signed with the Memphis Hustle. Stockton was removed from the team on February 14, 2022. He was reacquired by the Hustle on February 28.

Fort Wayne Mad Ants (2022–present)
On September 16, 2022, Stockton signed with the Indiana Pacers, but was waived one week later.

On October 24, 2022, Stockton joined the Fort Wayne Mad Ants training camp roster.

NBA career statistics

Regular season

|-
| style="text-align:left;"|
| style="text-align:left;"|Sacramento 
| 3 || 0 || 11.0 || .333 || .500 || .500 || .7 || 3.0 || .7 || .0 || 2.7
|-
| style="text-align:left;"|
| style="text-align:left;"|Utah 
| 3 || 0 || 3.0 || .667 || .667 || 1.000 || .0 || .0 || .0 || .0 || 3.3
|- class="sortbottom"
| align="center" colspan="2"|Career
| 6 || 0 || 7.0 || .444 || .600 || .700 || .3 || 1.5 || .3 || .0 || 3.0

Playoffs

|-
| style="text-align:left;"|2018
| style="text-align:left;"|Utah
| 2 || 0 || 3.0 || .333 || .000 ||  || .5 || .0 || .0 || .0 || 1.0
|- class="sortbottom"
| align="center" colspan="2"|Career
| 2 || 0 || 3.0 || .333 || .000 ||  || .5 || .0 || .0 || .0 || 1.0

Personal life

Stockton is the son of John and Nada Stockton. His father played 19 years for the Utah Jazz and entered the Naismith Basketball Hall of Fame in 2009. His great-grandfather, Houston Stockton, played football for Gonzaga from 1922 to 1924, going undefeated his senior year of 1924 as he earned All-America honorable mention honors. His eldest brother, Houston Jr., played football for University of Montana, and older brother, Michael, currently plays professionally.

Stockton is eligible for a Croatian passport, because his mother Nada is of Montenegrin and Croatian descent. She is a daughter of American politician Mike Stepovich.

See also
 List of second-generation National Basketball Association players

References

External links

 Gonzaga Bulldogs bio
 NBA D-League profile

1991 births
Living people
American expatriate basketball people in Croatia
American expatriate basketball people in Germany
American expatriate basketball people in New Zealand
American men's basketball players
American people of Croatian descent
American people of Montenegrin descent
American people of Serbian descent
Basketball players from Spokane, Washington
Gonzaga Bulldogs men's basketball players
Gonzaga Preparatory School alumni
KK Cedevita players
Medi Bayreuth players
Memphis Hustle players
New Zealand Breakers players
Point guards
Reno Bighorns players
Sacramento Kings players
South Bay Lakers players
Undrafted National Basketball Association players
United States men's national basketball team players
Utah Jazz players